Bruce Rankin Matthews (born August 8, 1961) is an American former professional football player who played as guard, center, offensive tackle and long snapper in the National Football League (NFL) for 19 seasons, from 1983 to 2001. He spent his entire career playing for the Houston / Tennessee Oilers / Titans franchise. Highly versatile, throughout his NFL career he played every position on the offensive line, starting in 99 games as a left guard, 87 as a center, 67 as a right guard, 22 as a right tackle, 17 as a left tackle, and was the long snapper on field goals, PATs, and punts. Having never missed a game due to injury, his 293 NFL games started is the third most of all time, behind quarterbacks Brett Favre and Tom Brady.

Matthews played college football for the University of Southern California, where he was recognized as a consensus All-American for the USC Trojans football team as a senior. He was selected in the first round of the 1983 NFL Draft by the Oilers. He was a 14-time Pro Bowl selection, tied for the second-most in NFL history, and a nine-time first-team All-Pro. Matthews was inducted into the Pro Football Hall of Fame in 2007, and his number 74 jersey is retired by the Titans.

After retiring as a player, Matthews served as an assistant coach for the Houston Texans and Titans. A member of the Matthews family of football players, he is the brother of linebacker Clay Matthews Jr.; father of center Kevin Matthews and tackle Jake Matthews; and uncle of linebacker Clay Matthews III and linebacker Casey Matthews.

Early years
Bruce Rankin Matthews was born in Raleigh, North Carolina, to Clay Matthews Sr. and Daisy Matthews. His father was a defensive lineman for the San Francisco 49ers in the 1950s. His family moved to Arcadia, California, when he was young. Bruce played football at Arcadia High School in Arcadia, California. He was an immediate football standout on the offensive and defensive line, along with doing well in high school wrestling. As a junior in 1977, he was named to the All-California Interscholastic Federation third-team, and as a senior Matthews played in the Shrine All-Star Football Classic alongside John Elway. Arcadia High later retired his No. 72 jersey.

College career
Matthews attended the University of Southern California, where he played all offensive line positions at various times for the USC Trojans football team. As a senior in 1982 he was shifted from weakside to strongside guard to replace departing Roy Foster as the principal blocker in the "Student Body Right" play. He was named to the first-team All-Pacific-10 Conference team after his junior and senior seasons. As a senior, he earned consensus All-America honors and won the Morris Trophy, which is awarded to the best lineman in the conference.

Professional career
Matthews is considered to be one of the most versatile offensive linemen to play in the NFL. He started in 99 games as a left guard, 67 as a right guard, 87 as a center, 22 as a right tackle, 17 as a left tackle, and was the snapper on field goals, PATs, and punts. He was selected to 14 Pro Bowls, which at the time tied a league record set by Merlin Olsen. Matthews was also named a first-team All-Pro nine times and an All-American Football Conference selection 12 times. An extremely durable player, Matthews retired after the 2001 season having played more games (296) than any NFL player, excluding kickers and punters, and played in more seasons (19) than any offensive lineman. He never missed a game due to injury, and started 229 consecutive games. Matthews is the only player who played against the Baltimore Colts in their last game at Memorial Stadium in 1983 and against the Baltimore Ravens in their last game at Memorial Stadium in 1997.

1983–1986: Guard, center, and tackle
The Houston Oilers drafted Matthews with the ninth overall pick in the first round of the 1983 NFL Draft. During his first two seasons, he blocked for future Hall of Fame running back Earl Campbell. As a rookie he played guard and was named to the PFWA All-Rookie Team. Before his second season Matthews was moved from right guard to center, snapping to rookie quarterback Warren Moon, but due to injuries on the offensive line he played multiple positions that season; at one point he played center, guard, and tackle in successive weeks. In 1985 and 1986, Matthews alternated between right and left tackle.

1987–1990: Right guard
Matthews sat out the first eight games of the 1987 season due to a contract dispute. When he returned, he was moved back to right guard. He remained at the right guard position in 1988, 1989, and 1990, and was invited to the Pro Bowl each season. He also earned first-team All-Pro recognition each year from the Associated Press (AP), Pro Football Weekly, and The Sporting News. Matthews thrived in the run and shoot offensive scheme adopted by the Oilers around this time, which required linemen to be exceptionally agile. The holes he opened up helped running back Mike Rozier to consecutive Pro Bowls in 1987 and 1988.

1991–1994: Center
The Oilers placed Matthews at center for the final game of the 1990 season in an effort to bolster the team's running game. Of the move, Matthews said, "I'd like to stay at guard, but forces greater than myself make these adjustments." Behind blocking by Matthews and fellow future Hall of Fame guard Mike Munchak, Oilers quarterback Warren Moon led the league in passing yards in 1990 and 1991, and running back Lorenzo White was a 1992 Pro Bowl selection. Matthews remained the team's center through the 1994 season, being named to the Pro Bowl each year.

1995–2001: Left guard
Prior to the 1995 season, Matthews signed a four-year, $10.3 million contract extension with the Oilers. That year, the Oilers signed free agent center Mark Stepnoski, and as a result Matthews moved to left guard. He spent the majority of the rest of his career at the position, occasionally filling in for injured players along the offensive line. During this time, the Oilers left Houston for Tennessee after the 1996 season. His blocking helped running back Eddie George to four straight Pro Bowl seasons. In 1999, at age 37, Matthews signed another four-year contract to remain with the Oilers. That season, the Oilers rebranded as the Tennessee Titans. The team won 13 games, plus three more in the playoffs before losing to the St. Louis Rams in Super Bowl XXXIV. Matthews retired from football prior to the 2002 season at age 40.

Coaching

Houston Texans
On February 27, 2009, Matthews returned to Houston where he was signed on as an offensive assistant with the Houston Texans after volunteer coaching at his children's high school, Elkins High School.

Tennessee Titans
On February 9, 2011, Matthews was hired as offensive line coach by new Tennessee Titans head coach Mike Munchak. Both were Hall of Fame linemen for the Houston Oilers. Regarding his new job, Matthews stated, "For me this is an opportunity of a lifetime. It is such a unique opportunity to work with Mike because I think he will do a great job. It is just one of those things I couldn't pass up."

After finishing the 2013 season with a 7–9 record, Titans general manager Ruston Webster and Tommy Smith met with Munchak and gave him the option to fire a large contingent of assistant coaches, which included Matthews, in exchange for an extension and a raise, or lose his job as head coach. Munchak was not willing to fire everyone they were ordering him to fire, so Munchak parted ways with the Titans, along with Matthews and the other assistant coaches they wanted him to fire.

Honors and legacy
In his first year of eligibility, Matthews was elected to the Pro Football Hall of Fame as part of the class of 2007. He was inducted during the Enshrinement Ceremony on August 5, 2007, with the unveiling of his bust, sculpted by Scott Myers.  He was the first player from the Tennessee Titans to be given this honor since the relocation from Houston. He was the fifth player from the 1983 NFL draft class to be enshrined, joining Dan Marino, Eric Dickerson, John Elway, and Jim Kelly; Darrell Green, Richard Dent, and Jim Covert later became the sixth, seventh, and eighth members. Matthews was selected as a guard on the NFL's All-Decade Team of the 1990s. In 2010, he was ranked 78th on The Top 100: NFL's Greatest Players by the NFL Network. At the 2020 Super Bowl, Matthews was named to the NFL 100 All-Time Team as one of the top 100 players of the first 100 years of the NFL.

Personal life

Matthews comes from a football family. A devout Christian as evidenced in his Hall of Fame Speech, he is the son of Clay Matthews Sr., who played in the NFL in the 1950s. His brother, Clay Jr., also played 19 seasons in the NFL. Bruce is the uncle of linebacker Clay Matthews III, former NFL linebacker Casey Matthews, and Kyle Matthews of USC football. Bruce and his wife, Carrie, have seven kids: Steven, Kevin, Marilyn, Jake, Mike, Luke, and Gwen. His son Kevin played center for Texas A&M until the 2009 football season and then played in the NFL for five years as a member of the Titans and Carolina Panthers. Jake Matthews played offensive tackle for Texas A&M and is currently the starting left tackle of the Atlanta Falcons. His son Mike played on the offensive line for Texas A&M, where he was the starting center. His youngest son, Luke, is currently a senior at Texas A&M. Matthews is the uncle of tight end Troy Niklas by way of his wife's sister.

Notes

See also
 List of NFL players by games played
 List of most consecutive starts and games played by National Football League players

References

External links
 
 

1961 births
Living people
American football centers
American football offensive guards
American football offensive tackles
Houston Oilers players
Tennessee Oilers players
Tennessee Titans players
USC Trojans football players
High school football coaches in Texas
All-American college football players
American Conference Pro Bowl players
National Football League players with retired numbers
Pro Football Hall of Fame inductees
Matthews football family
People from Arcadia, California
Players of American football from Raleigh, North Carolina
Players of American football from California
Houston Texans coaches
Tennessee Titans coaches
Ed Block Courage Award recipients